The Zastava M21 is a series of 5.56×45mm NATO rifles developed and manufactured by Zastava Arms in Serbia.

Description
The M21 is based on the Kalashnikov rifle, chambered in the 5.56×45mm NATO cartridge. The current models use a 1.5mm thick stamped receiver. The M21 can incorporate picatinny rails for mounting accessories like optics, vertical grips, bipods, etc.

The Zastava M21 is gas operated, long stroke piston with a rotating bolt locking system rifle. It features a hard chromium-plated, cold forged standard rifled or an optional polygonal rifled barrel, integrated 22mm flash hider grenade launcher, heavy-duty synthetic furniture with a polymer folding stock similarly to the AK-74M, and side optics rail as standard (optional adapter base for cover mounted picatinny rail also available). The rifle can also mount a 40mm under-barrel grenade launcher. It has a magazine capacity of 30 rounds. The cyclic rate of fire is 680 rounds per minute, and the sustained rate of fire is 120 rounds/min.

The Zastava M21 uses a conventional barrel, while the Zastava M21B uses a polygonal barrel. The regular barrel has six grooves with a right-hand twist. An octagonal polygonal version is also available and has four grooves with a right-hand twist (M21B). Barrels are also hard chrome plated to provide a longer service life.

The rifle has conventional iron sights that consist of a front post and a flip-up rear sight with 300m and 500m apertures. A set of picatinny rails on the hand guard can mount various optoelectronic devices. The M21 is a modular weapon, with configuration dependent on the task and mission.

Choices of optical sights include "TELEOPTIK" (ON M04) and "ZRAK" (ON M04A). Optoelectronic devices include a reflex sight ("MARS" M04), two bookmark target lasers ("AIM2000" M04A and "INFIZ" M04), two passive monoculars (M04 MINI N/SEAS and "MARS" M04+MINI N/SEAS), passive sight ("SOVA" PN 3x50).

Variants

The M21 comes in several assault rifle and carbine variants:
M21 A – Standard baseline assault rifle.
M21 ABS – Built-in picatinny rail system.
M21 S – Compact short barrel assault rifle.
M21 SBS – Built-in picatinny rail system.
M21 C – Carbine.
M21 BS – Built-in picatinny rail system.

Users

  – Used by special forces
  – Used by special forces
  – Used by federal (SIPA) and special police units.
  – Used by National Police.
  – Used by the Rapid Intervention Battalion (BIR)
 
 
  – 500 purchased in 2005.
 
  – standard service rifle of the Serbian Armed Forces and Gendarmery.
  - Used by G4S contractors.

See also

Zastava M70
Zastava M90
Zastava M19
AK-12
AN-94
R4 assault rifle
IMI Galil
Rk 95 Tp
List of assault rifles

References

External links

Zastava M21 at Zastava Arms

5.56 mm assault rifles
M21
Kalashnikov derivatives
Zastava Arms
Weapons and ammunition introduced in 2004
Military Technical Institute Belgrade